In emergency medical services such as an ambulance squad, a refusal of medical assistance is the term for when a patient refuses any or all parts of medical treatment.

Background
The refusal of medical assistance, or RMA, ensures the continuum of care that ambulance squads have a responsibility towards. In a typical emergency call, the ambulance service will assess and transport the patient to an appropriate facility. The ambulance squad's duty towards the patient begins with patient contact and generally ends with transfer to the emergency department of the receiving hospital. The call can terminate in other ways; for example an ambulance service may cancel their own services if the patient becomes violent (scene safety), if they are canceled by on-scene personnel (such as the police or, in the case of a MICU service, the on-scene BLS EMT), or at the discretion of the dispatcher (if another ambulance is better positioned to take the call).

In general, once patient contact has been established, the ambulance service must either transport or obtain an appropriate refusal from the patient.

Types

There are three general types of RMA, designated by scope. In the widest sense, the patient may even refuse to be evaluated by EMS. Generally, however, the patient will submit to an evaluation (consisting of vitals and an assessment) before asking or being asked about refusal by the EMS agency. Or a patient may refuse only specific actions, such as C-spine precautions.

Uses
As policy, ambulance services are usually unable to release a patient on their own - that is, a crew is usually unable to determine that a patient is fine (this is the job of the doctors in a hospital). Unofficially, it may be obvious that a patient does not need transport - in these situations, EMS personnel may 'guide' the patient towards an RMA.

The refusal is best suited for these situations; for example, a minor cut or bruise or uninjured parties in a motor vehicle accident. It can also be used where non-critical transport is advised, but it would be counterproductive to take the party by ambulance, e.g. an injured but fearful child could be comforted and transported to the hospital or doctor's office by the parent.

In general, ambulance squads are unable to contravene the wishes of a mentally competent patient. This may lead to situations of likely cardiac compromise, likely internal trauma, or other life-threatening situations. However, if the patient is of sound mind, they are generally able to refuse treatment. The EMS provider has limited options at this point, since EMS generally cannot restrain and take a person involuntarily. However, depending on local policy, the police may be able to place the patient in protective custody (essentially arresting the person and releasing them to the EMS agency). This option is not to be pursued lightly. This is typically termed the RMA-AMA (refusal of medical assistance against medical advice) to differentiate it from a standard RMA (which may be assumed to be the end to a trivial call)

Issues with refusal
Most EMS providers operate on the principle of informed consent; that is, patients must know exactly what it is they are refusing, and what the possible consequences might be, in order to make a proper decision. This precludes parties who are intoxicated or otherwise incapable of making an informed decision, such as the mentally incompetent. Otherwise, agencies could release someone who was not able to understand what refusing might mean to their health.

For similar reasons, minors (those under the age of 18) are generally unable to refuse medical care. In these circumstances, the crew can elect to wait for a parent or other legal guardian, who is able to.

The refusal itself
Ideally, the refusal is a form provided by and filled out by the agency and signed by multiple parties - usually the EMS agency itself, the patient (or his legal proxy or guardian), and a witness (ideally a police officer). A copy is attached to the patient care report or otherwise secured and retained by the agency, and another copy is usually given to the patient. The patient is advised of the risks of refusal, including the fact that their condition may worsen, and advised to call 9-1-1 or the emergency number without hesitation if they feel the need.

See also
 Informed refusal
 Advance healthcare directive
 Passive euthanasia
 Right to die

References

Emergency medical services